KXOX is a radio station in the Sweetwater, Texas area, simulcast on 96.7 FM and 1240 AM. The station's format is country music. The station is owned by Stein Broadcasting Company. The broadcast first went on the air on November 19th, 1939.

Past personalities 
Ed Alexander - sportscaster (1950-1951, 1954-1955)

References

External links
KXOX official website

Country radio stations in the United States
XOX
Radio stations established in 1935